The Saint Lucia U-17 men's national soccer team is the national under-17 association football team of Saint Lucia and is controlled by the Saint Lucia Football Association.

History

CONCACAF U-17 Championship record
 1983: Didn't participate
 1985: Didn't participate
 1987: Didn't participate
 1988: Group Stage
 1991: Didn't participate
 1992: Didn't participate
 1994: Didn't participate
 1996: Didn't participate
 1999: Didn't qualify
 2001: Didn't qualify
 2003: Didn't qualify
 2005: Didn't qualify
 2007: Didn't qualify
 2009: Didn't participate
 2011: Didn't participate
 2013: Didn't qualify
 2015: Group Stage
 2017: Didn't qualify

• Tournaments from 1999 to 2007 followed a two group format. No championship game took place, and no standings were given. The top teams in their respective groups qualified, and the second placed teams played in a playoff to decide the final seed. In 2009, the tournament was interrupted due to the swine flu.

FIFA U-17 World Cup record
 1985: Did not participate
 1987: Did not participate
 1989: Did not qualify
 1991: Did not participate
 1993: Did not participate
 1995: Did not participate
 1997: Did not participate
 1999: Did not qualify
 2001: Did not qualify
 2003: Did not qualify
 2005: Did not qualify
 2007: Did not qualify
 2009: Did not participate
 2011: Did not participate
 2013: Did not qualify
 2015: Did not qualify
 2017: Did not qualify
 2019: Did not participate
 2021: To be determined

References

under-17